Satyajit Biswas ( 1981 – 9 February 2019) was an Indian politician from the state of West Bengal. He was a two term member of the West Bengal Legislative Assembly.

He was shot dead on 9 February 2019 at the age of 37 after he was coming down at the podium of Saraswati puja. His widow Rupaali Biswas became the candidate of TMC of 2019 Indian general elections from Ranaghat (Lok Sabha constituency).

Constituency
He represented the Krishnaganj (Vidhan Sabha constituency).

Political party 
He was from the All India Trinamool Congress.

References 

West Bengal MLAs 2011–2016
West Bengal MLAs 2016–2021
Trinamool Congress politicians from West Bengal
1980s births
2019 deaths
Year of birth missing